Epermenia anacantha is a moth in the family Epermeniidae. It was described by Edward Meyrick in 1917. It is found in Sri Lanka.

The wingspan is about 12 mm. The forewings are light fuscous or greyish ochreous, the base suffused with fine dark fuscous irroration (sprinkling) and the margins with a faint coarse strigulation of dark fuscous specks. The hindwings are grey.

References

Epermeniidae
Moths described in 1917
Taxa named by Edward Meyrick
Moths of Sri Lanka